The following is a list of all suspensions and fines enforced in the Elitserien during the 2011–12 Elitserien season. It lists which players or coaches of what team have been punished for which offense and the amount of punishment they have received. Note that a value of "N/A" in the "Length" or "Fine" column indicates that the player or coach was not suspended or fined for the particular incident. If a particular suspension lasts longer than a month, no fines are imposed. Each suspension covers not only Elitserien games but also ice hockey in general – for example, international tournaments such as the Euro Hockey Tour or the European Trophy. However, this article only mentions the amount of Elitserien games each suspension covers. Note that the two suspensions on 1 November and the two suspensions on 7 November 2011 are unrelated to each other.

References 

2011–12 Elitserien season
2011-12